The Skeena Watershed Conservation Coalition is a non-governmental organization based in British Columbia which  opposes Royal Dutch Shell's Klappan Coalbed Methane Project in a region dubbed the Sacred Headwaters by the Tahltan people, which is located in a mountainous area where the Klappan, Stikine, Skeena and Nass Rivers all have their origin. It was founded in 2004 by a diverse group of people living and working in the Skeena River watershed.

References

Tahltan
Stikine Country
Shell plc controversies
Politics of British Columbia
Environmental issues in Canada
2004 establishments in British Columbia